In computer-aided design, behavioral modeling is a high-level circuit modeling technique where behavior of logic is modeled. 

The Verilog-AMS and VHDL-AMS languages are widely used to model logic behavior.

Other modeling approaches 
  RTL Modeling : logic is modeled at register level.
 Structural Modeling : logic is modeled at both register level and gate level.

References 
Analog Behavioral Modeling with the Verilog-A Language by Dan FitzPatrick, Ira Miller.

Computer-aided design